The 1985 Augustana (Illinois) Vikings football team was an American football team that represented Augustana College as a member of the College Conference of Illinois and Wisconsin (CCIW) during the 1985 NCAA Division III football season. In their seventh season under head coach Bob Reade, the Vikings compiled a perfect 13–0 record and won the CCIW championship. It was the third of four consecutive national championships.

The team's statistical leaders included Greg Wallace with 423 passing yards, Brad Price with 1,087 rushing yards, Eric Welgat with 268 receiving yards, and Shan McCormick with 84 points scored.

They played their home games at Ericson Field in Rock Island, Illinois.

Schedule

References

Augustana
Augustana (Illinois) Vikings football seasons
NCAA Division III Football Champions
College football undefeated seasons
Augustana (Illinois) Vikings football